Zoran Cvetanović (Serbian Cyrillic: Зоран Цвeтановић; born 11 May 1953) is a Serbian retired footballer who played for FK Partizan.

From 2004 to 2012, he was FK Partizan's marketing director.

References

External links
Danas article

1953 births
Living people
Footballers from Belgrade
Yugoslav footballers
Serbian footballers
Association football midfielders
Yugoslav First League players
FK Partizan players
OFK Beograd players